Pratibha Nandakumar (25 January 1955) is an Indian poet, journalist, feminist, columnist and activist who works in Kannada and English. She is considered as one of the pioneers of modern woman's poetry in Kannada literature. For her work Kavadeyaata, Praribha was awarded the Karnataka Sahitya Akademi Award for Poetry in 1998.

Personal life
Pratibha was born on 25 January 1955 in Bangalore to Ramachandrarao and Yamunabai. An alumna of Madras University, Pratibha married to Nandakumar and they have a son and daughter.

Career

As poet
Pratibha published her first work, Naavu Hudugiyare Heege, a collection of poems in 1979, was considered path-breaking literary work by many. Her other important works including ‛ Aha Purushakaram’,  ‛Ee Tanaka’, ‛Rastheyanchigina Gaadi’, ‛Yaana’, ’Akramana’ and others.

Media and theatre works
Pratibha has worked as journalist, columnist and special correspondent for leading newspapers including Indian Express, Deccan Herald and Bangalore Mirror.

Pratibha is known for her experimental works in theatre. She organised a unique way of presenting poems with the performance of the poets, called ‛Ondu Lessu Ondu Plassu’, which was well received. She also experimented Teredashte Bagilu, a literary work of Jayanth Kaikini, into multi-media installation, an art form.

Literary works
Poetry
 Navu Hudugiyare Heege
 Ee Tanaka
 Rasteyanchina Gaadi
 Kavadeyaata
 Aha! Purushakaram
 Cowboys Mattu Kama Purana
 Mudukiyarigidu Kaalavalla
 Coffee House
 " Erotica"
Essays
 Nimmi (2000)
 Mirchi Masala (2001)

Short Fiction
 Akramana (1997)
 Yaana (1997)

Autobiography
 Anudinada Antharagange

Accolades
 Karnataka Sahitya Akademi Award for Poetry (1998)
 Shivarama Karantha Prashasti (1999)
 Mahadevi Verma Kavya Samman (2003)
 Hoogar Memorial Award for Journalism'' (2006)

References

1955 births
Writers from Karnataka
21st-century Indian people
21st-century Indian women writers
21st-century Indian writers
Kannada-language writers
Kannada poets
Kannada people
Feminist writers
Living people